Saint Roger of Cannae (1060 – December 30, 1129) was an Italian bishop. The Catholic Church honours him as a saint.

Biography
Roger (in Italian: Ruggero di Canne) was elected bishop of the town of Cannae, where a small diocese already had risen in the 10th century. 
In 1083 there was the destruction by Robert Guiscard, king of the Normans. Roger contributed to the moral and material reconstruction of the ancient city of Apulia, supporting his fellow citizens with the consolations of faith and the material aid.

The Cannes Anonymous, an ancient local biographical sources of the 14th century, reveals some aspects of the personality of Roger: "He was very gracious et zealous for the salvation of souls [...] his bishop-house was a pure hospitia that was always open to accommodate the pilgrims and poor"

Some documents of that period show that the holy bishop was often consulted by popes Gelasius II and Paschal II to settle certain questions of law and quell the rivalry between churches and community.

He died December 30, 1129.

His relics were translated in the near city of Barletta, in 1276.

His memorial is celebrated on 30 December, as reported by the Roman Martyrology.

References

1060s births
1129 deaths
Italian Roman Catholic saints
Medieval Italian saints